Mary Mills (born January 19, 1940) is a retired American professional golfer. She became a member of the LPGA Tour in 1962 and won three major championships and nine LPGA Tour victories in all.

Amateur career
Mills was born in Laurel, Mississippi. She began playing golf at age 11 and her instructor was Johnny Revolta, an 18-time PGA Tour winner and PGA Championship victor. She won the Mississippi State Amateur eight consecutive years starting in 1954, and won the Gulf Coast Amateur twice. She was also medalist in the U.S. Girls' Junior, Western Junior, and the National Collegiate Championship. She attended Millsaps College where she was the No. 1 golfer – on the men's team – all four years.

Professional career
Mills turned pro and joined the LPGA Tour in 1962, and earned LPGA Rookie of the Year honors. She posted multiple wins in three different seasons on tour, and was in the top-10 on the money list five times, with a high finish of sixth in 1973. She won the U.S. Women's Open in 1963 and the LPGA Championship in 1964 and 1973. She finished in the top ten on the money list four times, with her best finish being sixth place in 1973. She continued playing a full LPGA Tour schedule into the 1980s. She also continued her education. A philosophy major at Millsaps, she returned to school in the 1990s to earn a master's degree in landscape architecture from Florida International University. She puts that degree to use these days designing golf courses. She is also a well-regarded golf instructor.

Professional wins

LPGA Tour wins (9)

LPGA Tour playoff record (1–1)

Major championships

Wins (3)

See also
List of golfers with most LPGA major championship wins

External links

Mary Mills bio at golfcompendium.com

American female golfers
LPGA Tour golfers
Winners of LPGA major golf championships
Golfers from Mississippi
Golfers from Florida
Florida International University alumni
People from Laurel, Mississippi
Sportspeople from Boca Raton, Florida
1940 births
Living people